Copa Catalunya is the name given to the regional group of Catalonia in the Primera División de Baloncesto basketball championship, that is the fifth tier level in the Spanish basketball league system, after the Liga ACB, LEB Oro, LEB Plata and Liga EBA. It is administered by the Catalan Basketball Federation since 1999 and is played under FIBA rules.

Championship format

28 teams divided in two groups of 14, disputed a league. Each team of has to play with all the other teams of its group twice, once at home and the other at the opponent's arena. Each victory adds two points to the team in the league ranking, while each loss adds only one. At the end of the league:

 The four best teams of the Regular season of each groups advances to Fase Final.
 The winners of Quarter-Finales play Final Four. The Champion promotes to Liga EBA.
 The worst team of each groups are relegated to CC 1ª Categoria.
 Teams qualified between ten and thirteen position of each groups play the relegation play-offs, losers are relegated to CC 1ª Categoria.

At the half of the league, will organize an All Star match, at its own discretion. The format of this match will face a selection of players from Group 01 to a selection of players from Group 02.

Seasons

Copa Catalunya
All Copa Catalunya Seasons since 1999.

Copa Federació

All Star

1 CB Castellar played CC 1ª Categoria, but the player was invited to participate.

External links
 Catalan Basketball Federation

References and notes

Basketball in Catalonia
5